Jules Georges Édouard Thilges (17 February 1817 – 9 July 1904) was a Luxembourgish politician.  He was the seventh Prime Minister of Luxembourg, serving for over three years, from 20 February 1885 until 22 September 1888.

Born in 1817 in Clervaux. From 1833 to 1838 he studied law at the universities of Brussels and Liège. In 1841 he became a lawyer at the tribunal of Diekirch, 

From 22 September 1854 to 21 May 1856 he was the Administrator General of Communal Affairs. 

For several periods from 1857 to 1904, he was a member of the Council of State. 

He was the Director General for the Interior and for Justice from 15 July 1859 to 26 September 1860.

He was once again Director General for Communal Affairs from 3 December 1867 to 7 February 1870. 

He was the head of government, Minister of State, and Director General for Foreign Affairs, from 20 February 1885 to 22 September 1888. 

Thilges died in Luxembourg in 1904.

See also 
 Thilges Ministry

|-

|-

|-

|-

Prime Ministers of Luxembourg
Ministers for Justice of Luxembourg
Ministers for Foreign Affairs of Luxembourg
Presidents of the Council of State of Luxembourg
Members of the Chamber of Deputies (Luxembourg)
Members of the Council of State of Luxembourg
1817 births
1904 deaths
People from Clervaux
19th-century Luxembourgian lawyers